Michael Herbig (born 29 April 1968) is a German comedian and actor. His nickname "Bully" (in German commonly associated with the VW Bully, rather than the English term) became part of his stage name as a comedian.

Career 

His career began in 1992 with regular appearances on radio (more than 800), leading to appearances on various television shows. He gained wider fame as writer, actor and director of the comedy show Bullyparade. The show featured him as the host, his good friend Rick Kavanian, Christian Tramitz and Diana Herold as a dancer and occasional actress in the skits. The show featured many different themes, including stereotypical gay archetypes in a Star Trek parody, an homage to westerns, and of the Austrian royal, Elisabeth of Bavaria, known as Sissi. On the show, he let the audience vote which theme to use for each of his movies based upon characters from the show. The first, the 2001 Der Schuh des Manitu ("Manitou's Shoe") was seen by over 11.7 million people, one of the most successful German films to date. His second film, (T)Raumschiff Surprise – Periode 1 (2004) was also a commercial success, cementing his career.

On 7 January 2008, Variety reported that Herbig was set to film a live-action adaptation of animated series Vicky the Viking. The film, carrying the same name as the animated series, was released in 2009.

In 2018, the film Balloon was released, in which he acted as a director, screenwriter and producer. It is his first directorial work that is not a comedy. The movie depicts the balloon escape of the Strelzyk and Wetzel families from East to West Germany in 1979.

Herbig voiced Sheriff Woody in the German dubs of Toy Story 3 and 4, after his former German dubber Peer Augustinski had a stroke in 2005 and died in 2014.

Awards 
2001 Bavarian Film Awards (Special Prize)

Filmography

References

External links 

 
Michael 'Bully' Herbig at the German Dubbing Card Index

1968 births
Living people
Comedy film directors
German parodists
Parody film directors
Film directors from Munich
German male comedians
Male actors from Munich
German male film actors
German male television actors
German male voice actors
21st-century German male actors